Francesco di Oberto (14th century) was an Italian painter of the early Renaissance period, active mainly in Genoa. He painted a Madonna between two angels  for the church of San Domenico.

References

14th-century Italian painters
Italian male painters
Painters from Genoa
Italian Renaissance painters
Year of death unknown
Year of birth unknown